The Calcutta Chamber Orchestra is a chamber orchestra based in Kolkata, West Bengal, India. It was formerly named the Calcutta Foundation Orchestra and assumed its present name after being taken over by the Calcutta School of Music.

The Orchestra came to have its current set up in 2005.

References

External links
 

Chamber orchestras
Indian orchestras
Culture of Kolkata
Musical groups established in 2005
2005 establishments in West Bengal